Cyril Arthur Bennett Horsford  (25 January 1876 – 16 December 1953) was for many years a leading authority on the anatomy and physiology of the throat. A passion for music led him to publish a work for singers, Why Voices Fail, after which he was much sought after by the leading singers of his day. He later became Laryngologist to the Royal Choral Society, the Royal College of Music and the Royal Society of Musicians.

Life
Cyril Arthur Bennett Horsford was born in 1876, the son of the Hon. Samuel Horsford of St Kitts in the West Indies.  He was educated at Bedford Modern School and the University of Edinburgh graduating with an MB ChB in 1898. He graduated with an MD in 1902, and was elected FRCS in the same year.

Horsford served as clinical assistant at the Throat Hospital in Golden Square and was registrar at the Central Throat and Ear Hospital (1905–13). He later set up private practice on Harley Street. In 1912 he wrote a medical paper entitled ‘Why voices fail’ following which he attracted many singers to his practice on Harley Street. Such was his success that he became laryngologist to the Royal College of Music, the Royal Choral Society and the Royal Society of Musicians. He regularly lectured on the medical aspects of voice production.

Horsford's later hospital appointments included the posts of honorary surgeon to the Princess Beatrice Hospital in Kensington and honorary surgeon in charge of the ear, nose and throat department of the St Pancras Dispensary.

Horsford married Edith Louise (née Sayers), the adopted daughter and ward of the late Miss Lascelles-Jones. He died on 16 December 1953 and was survived by his wife, a daughter and son.

Selected papers
 Why Voices Fail
 An Original Method of Facilitating Intralaryngial Operations
 The Epiglottic Suture - Its value in Indirect Laryngoscopy
 Cancer of the Larynx

References

Fellows of the Royal College of Surgeons
1876 births
People educated at Bedford Modern School
1953 deaths
Alumni of the University of Edinburgh
British surgeons